Salvia gesneriflora (sometimes spelled Salvia gesneriiflora) is a herbaceous perennial plant or subshrub native to mountainous provinces of the Sierra Madre Oriental in Mexico, growing at  elevation. The long tubular flowers of this salvia resemble Gesneria flowers. It is a popular ornamental plant.

Description
Hard annual pruning prevents the plant from breakage. The plant has many woody stems and very heavy with foliage that break easily in wind and rain. The heart-shaped leaves are mid-green, very aromatic, and graduated in size.

It blooms in late winter and early spring, with hard annual pruning (down to leaf nodes near the ground) recommended after blooming.

Varieties
In a 1970 collecting trip to Mexico by Huntington Botanical Gardens, two distinct varieties were collected — one with the more common green calyx, and one with a purple calyx and stem which was given the cultivar name 'Tequila'. A seedling selected from 'Tequila' around 1979 was named 'Mole Poblano', though there is some evidence that it is not distinct from 'Tequila'.

References

gesneriflora
Flora of Mexico
Flora of the Sierra Madre Oriental
Garden plants of North America